The following lists events that happened during 2011 in Djibouti.

Incumbents
President: Ismaïl Omar Guelleh
Prime Minister: Dileita Mohamed Dileita

Events

February
 February 18 - Police shoot tear gas at thousands of people demonstrating against the Ismail Omar Guelleh regime in Djibouti.

May
 May 12 - The International Criminal Court asks the United Nations Security Council to take action over Djibouti's failure to arrest Sudanese President Omar al-Bashir, who was indicted by the court on charges of war crimes.

References

 
2010s in Djibouti
Years of the 21st century in Djibouti
Djibouti
Djibouti